The Eastern Zone was one of the three regional zones of the 1960 Davis Cup.

6 teams entered the Eastern Zone, with the winner going on to compete in the Inter-Zonal Zone against the winners of the America Zone and Europe Zone. The Philippines defeated India in the final and progressed to the Inter-Zonal Zone.

Draw

Quarterfinals

Japan vs. South Korea

Ceylon vs. India

Semifinals

Philippines vs. Japan

Thailand vs. India

Final

Philippines vs. India

References

External links
Davis Cup official website

Davis Cup Asia/Oceania Zone
Eastern Zone
Davis Cup